Harold Joseph "Happy" Hogan is a fictional character appearing in American comic books published by Marvel Comics. He is usually depicted as a supporting character in stories featuring Iron Man / Tony Stark, for whom he works as a chauffeur, bodyguard, and personal assistant. Happy is close friends with his employer, and is among the first people in the Marvel Universe to discover his identity as the armored superhero. He is also the father of the Teen Abomination, and was married to Pepper Potts. Hogan earned the ironic nickname "Happy" during his boxing days from his reluctance to smile.

Director Jon Favreau portrays Happy Hogan in the Marvel Cinematic Universe films Iron Man (2008), Iron Man 2 (2010), Iron Man 3 (2013), Spider-Man: Homecoming (2017), Avengers: Endgame, Spider-Man: Far From Home (both 2019), and Spider-Man: No Way Home (2021). Favreau also voices alternate reality versions of the character in the Disney+ animated series What If...? (2021).

Publication history
Created by writers Stan Lee and Robert Bernstein and artist Don Heck, Happy Hogan first appeared in Tales of Suspense #45 (Sept. 1963).

Fictional character biography
A former boxer with a history of losing fights, Hogan is hired by Tony Stark as his chauffeur and personal assistant after Happy saves Tony's life. While hospitalized after being beaten up by a supervillain called the Unicorn, he had an allergic reaction to flowers. Happy learns that Tony is Iron Man.

Then, a desperately ill Happy is mutated into a giant, savage, nearly mindless, superhumanly strong humanoid known as the Freak when doctors try to cure him using a cobalt ray machine powered by Stark's experimental "Enervator" device. The Freak breaks loose and goes on a rampage, escaping before Iron Man can arrive to stop him.

Iron Man leads the Freak back to his laboratory, but runs out of power and collapses. The Freak encounters Pepper Potts, who faints at the sight of him, and he carries her away. The police fire on him, causing him to drop Pepper. Iron Man saves Pepper, and leads the Freak to his lab again. He is restored to his normal self in Tales of Suspense #76 (April 1966) when Iron Man exposes him to the Enervator once again, though he is afflicted with temporary amnesia that lasts until Tales of Suspense #83 (November 1966).

Later, while helping Iron Man rebuild his armor, Happy is again exposed to cobalt rays and is again transformed into the Freak. The Freak smashes Iron Man through a wall, and takes Pepper with him. Iron Man is able to again return Happy to normal.

The Collector later kidnaps Happy and Pepper, hoping to add the Freak to his collection. This draws Iron Man's attention, who intervenes and rescues his friends.

Later, after Happy is injured while wearing the Iron Man armor, Stark uses the Enervator to save him, thinking that he has corrected the problems with the device. But again it transforms Happy into the Freak, who goes on another rampage. He exposes himself to cobalt radiation, causing him to glow with cobalt energy that will eventually reach critical mass and cause him to explode. The two battle, until Stark is able to use the Enervator to again revert Happy to normal, apparently for the last time.

He marries Pepper Potts in Tales of Suspense #91 (July 1967), but they later divorce.

Happy has worked for almost all of Stark's companies, including Stark Industries, Stark Enterprises and Stark Solutions. However, when Tony/Iron Man disappears during the Onslaught saga, Hogan refuses to be employed by Stark-Fujikawa, but is re-employed when Stark returns. He also remarries Pepper Potts.

With the events of the 2006 "Civil War" storyline causing Tony Stark considerable moral, political and emotional problems, Happy Hogan continues to give Tony much needed advice. In an important moment of crisis, he says to Tony: "You, my friend, are the only cape in the bunch [of superheroes] that's both one of us [that is, human] and one of them. Who else can see both sides the way you do?" On the night of his anniversary with Pepper, Hogan is attacked by the Spymaster, who is seeking to use Hogan as bait to draw out Iron Man. The Spymaster threatens to kill Hogan first, then Pepper. Angered, Hogan grabs him by the neck and they fall several stories, leaving Hogan in a vegetative coma.

While he is in the coma, Pepper tells Tony of Cobra McCoyle, a former boxing friend who took too many hits to the head. Cobra is unable to even feed himself and must be taken care of. Pepper tells Tony that Hogan has declared he never wants to end up like McCoyle. At the end of Iron Man vol. 4 #14, Hogan apparently dies. The issue leaves it ambiguous whether Hogan dies naturally or whether it is because Tony Stark digitally interfaced with and shut down Hogan's life support.

Following this, Tony experiences occasional hallucinations of Happy, which Doc Samson attributes to the Extremis process; as a result of Tony's mind being accelerated by the Extremis process to allow him to interface with his armor directly; his subconscious mind often processes information that he was not consciously aware of, with this information being 'filtered' by the part of Tony's mind that stored his guilt to stop him facing it, resulting in illusions of Happy or Steve Rogers appearing to prompt Tony to acknowledge key information that he had not registered himself.

Later, when Tony (slowly losing his mind to prevent Norman Osborn from getting the Superhero Registration Act information) and Pepper are in hiding, Pepper reminds him of all his friends and allies, with Happy being one of them. Tony then replies, "Who's Happy?"

After experiencing a moral inversion, Tony is confronted by a new, teenage version of the Abomination when he relocates to San Francisco. While talking with the Teen Abomination, Tony learns that he is Jamie Carlson, the son of former Stark Industries employee Katrina Carlson who was exposed to gamma radiation during an accident at the company when Tony was busy fighting a wizard from another dimension during an earlier time. Initially planning to analyze and use the Teen Abomination's powers for himself, Tony changes his mind when the analysis of the boy's DNA reveals that Happy Hogan was his father, leaving Tony resolving to heal the boy, as Happy was one of the few people he ever respected.

During the "Iron Man 2020" event, Pepper is introduced to an off the grid navigation incorporated in the Rescue armor that Tony previously developed before Y2K called H.A.P.P.Y. (short for Host Analogue Program Pre-Y2K) where its personality is modeled after Happy Hogan. While having been programmed to not fall under the control of the A.I. Army, H.A.P.P.Y. helped Pepper in "rebuilding" Tony who was operating as Mark 1.

Powers and abilities
As the Freak, Happy possesses unnatural strength, surpassing this by a hundred. His skin is so tough that almost nothing can hurt him. He has the ability to absorb cobalt energy and increase his power. In this form, he could discharge it from his hands into blasts. He can also release lethal radioactive levels to create nuclear explosions. But as Happy, he has skills in unarmed combat, especially boxing.

Other versions

Amalgam Comics
In the Amalgam Universe, DC Comics's Green Lantern and Marvel's Iron Man are combined to create Iron Lantern. Iron Lantern is secretly Hal Stark, owner of Stark Aircraft, a developer of experimental aircraft. Stark's chief mechanic is Happy Kalmaku (an amalgamation of Marvel's Happy Hogan and DC's Thomas Kalmaku). Happy is in love with test pilot Pepper Ferris (an amalgamation of Marvel's Pepper Potts and DC's Carol Ferris). Unfortunately for Happy, Pepper is not only in love with Stark, she is also secretly the supervillainess Madame Sapphire (a combination of Marvel's Madame Masque and DC's Star Sapphire). Happy Kalmaku first appeared in Iron Lantern #1 (April 1997), published jointly by Marvel and DC. He was created by Kurt Busiek (script) and Paul Smith (art).

Heroes Reborn
In the 1996-97 Heroes Reborn series, Happy Hogan is Stark's public relations chief. He has a brief romantic relationship with Pepper. He is also attacked by the villain Rebel and is seen later in a hospital bed.

Marvel Zombies Return
In the Marvel Zombies universe, Happy appears in Marvel Zombies Return. He is working for Stark International; at this point Tony Stark is a useless drunk and S.I. headquarters is literally falling apart. Happy goes off to investigate a disturbance in the basement and falls prey to the zombie Giant Man who had teleported in from another dimension. The former hero bites and turns Hogan into a zombie. Happy then leads a zombie outbreak among the staff. James Rhodes kills him by destroying his head.

Ultimate Marvel
In the Ultimate Marvel universe, Hogan appears alongside Iron Man in the Ultimates series, which is part of the Ultimate Marvel line of Ultimates comics. He is seen many times, sometimes with Pepper Potts, in the Iron Man armor control room.

In the spin-off novel Tomorrow Men by Michael Jan Friedman, it is revealed that he has a supervisory position at the Triskelion; the Ultimates' headquarters. Furthermore, although Hogan has worked with Stark for a long time, he never officially achieved his MIT degree.

In Ultimate Human, although he is never seen on page, Tony Stark is seen talking to him on a cell phone, and then continuing the conversation after he is in an Iron Man suit.

In other media

Television

 Happy Hogan appears in the Iron Man segment of The Marvel Super Heroes, voiced by Tom Harvey. He also appears as the Freak (called the Monster in the Black Knight episode).
 Happy Hogan appears in the animated series Iron Man: Armored Adventures, voiced by Alistair Abell. In this version, Happy is a tall and muscular, but overexcitable and gentle-hearted basketball jock.

Marvel Cinematic Universe
Happy Hogan appears in the Marvel Cinematic Universe, portrayed by Jon Favreau (who was also the director of the first two Iron Man films).

 In Iron Man, Happy is introduced as Tony Stark's bodyguard, chauffeur, and close friend.
 In Iron Man 2, Happy welcomes Stark upon his arrival at the Stark Expo. When Stark receives a subpoena to appear before Congress by a U.S. Marshal, Happy takes the subpoena stating that Tony doesn't like to be handed things. Happy later assists Natasha Romanoff in raiding Hammer Industries, where he struggles in his fight with one of the security personnel.
 In Iron Man 3, Happy is the head of security for Stark Industries, having been promoted as he complained about feeling ridiculous announcing himself as Stark's bodyguard. He witnesses the side-effects of an Extremis enhanced Jack Taggart and gets into conflict with Eric Savin. He is rendered comatose when Taggart explodes, prompting Stark to go after the Mandarin. At the end, he regains consciousness.
 In Spider-Man: Homecoming, Happy is assigned by Stark as head of Asset Management for the Avengers, overseeing the transition of the Avengers moving from the Avengers Tower to the Avengers Compound. He is also assigned by Stark as a point of contact for Peter Parker, but is shown to abhor the job. Peter continuously calls Happy, much to his annoyance and Happy later hangs up on Peter’s friend Ned Leeds when he tries to call him for help during Vulture's mid-air heist. However, Happy witnesses the heist from Avengers Tower, and he and the authorities find Vulture tied up on Coney Island. He goes to Peter’s high school, expressing his gratitude, and takes him to the Avengers Compound, and tells Stark that "he's a good kid." He also gives Stark his engagement ring for him and Pepper Potts.
 Happy appears in a deleted scene from Avengers: Infinity War. He complains to Tony Stark about the pressure he's under to keep the press from ruining Tony and Pepper Potts' upcoming wedding. He finally ends up chasing a paparrazo played by co-director Joe Russo. 
 In Avengers: Endgame, Happy attends Stark's funeral and comforts his daughter, Morgan Stark.  
 In Spider-Man: Far From Home, Happy continues to stay in contact with Peter, informing him of Nick Fury's attempts to recruit him and helping him deal with Stark’s loss which brings them closer. He rescues Peter from the Netherlands and takes him to London, where he helps Leeds, MJ, Betty Brant, and Flash Thompson who are targeted by Mysterio's drones. He also begins a relationship with May Parker, which Peter eventually confronts them about, though May does not acknowledge them as dating.
Alternate timeline versions of Happy appear in the Disney+ animated series What If...?. The first version appears in the episode "What If... Zombies?!", in which most of Earth's population is infected by a quantum virus that turns those infected into zombies. Happy is part of a group of survivors attempting to find a cure, though he is infected by the zombified Clint Barton and subsequently killed by Sharon Carter. The second version appears in "What If... Killmonger Rescued Tony Stark?". During Stark’s press conference, he expresses disapproval when Stark introduces Erik "Killmonger" Stevens and in order to restrain Obadiah Stane (whom Killmonger exposes for having cooperated with the Ten Rings), punches him.
In Spider-Man: No Way Home, Happy is under investigation by federal agents for missing Stark Industries technology, with lawyer Matt Murdock who had Peter's charges dropped subtly trying to get Happy to hire him. He allows Peter and May to stay at his condominium complex after Mysterio exposes Spider-Man's secret identity to the public, which they use as a base of operations to cure several multiverse displaced villains who conflicted with other versions of Spider-Man. Happy arrives at the destroyed complex shortly after May was killed by the Green Goblin and encouraged Peter to run as he was taken into custody by Damage Control. At the end of the film, Happy encounters Peter (who he does not remember due to Doctor Strange casting a spell to make the world forget about Parker) at May's grave and the two reflect on her legacy, before Peter leaves telling Hogan to take care of himself.

Video games
 The Marvel Cinematic Universe version of Happy Hogan appears as an unlockable playable character in Lego Marvel's Avengers, voiced by Chris Cox.

References

External links
 Happy Hogan at Marvel.com

Comics characters introduced in 1963
Characters created by Stan Lee
Characters created by Don Heck
Marvel Comics film characters
Marvel Comics male characters
Marvel Comics martial artists
Marvel Comics mutates
Marvel Comics characters with superhuman strength
Fictional boxers
Fictional drivers
Fictional bodyguards
Fictional characters with nuclear or radiation abilities
Fictional characters with superhuman durability or invulnerability
Iron Man characters